Celeste Brown (born 4 August 1994 in Hornsby, Australia) is an Australian-Cook Island swimmer. She competed in the women's 50m freestyle at the 2012 Summer Olympics in London, finishing with a time of 29.36 seconds in 54th place in the heats. She is a member of the Church of Jesus Christ of Latter-day Saints.

References

External links

1994 births
Living people
Sportswomen from New South Wales
Olympic swimmers of the Cook Islands
Swimmers at the 2012 Summer Olympics
Swimmers at the 2010 Summer Youth Olympics
Cook Island Latter Day Saints
Swimmers from Sydney
Australian people of Cook Island descent
Australian female swimmers
Cook Island female swimmers